Fred Zollner (January 22, 1901 – June 21, 1982), nicknamed "Mr. Pro Basketball", was the founder and owner along with his sister Janet of the Fort Wayne Zollner Pistons (now the Detroit Pistons) and a key figure in the merger of National Basketball League (NBL) and Basketball Association of America (BAA) into the National Basketball Association (NBA) in 1949. He was inducted as a contributor into the Naismith Memorial Basketball Hall of Fame.

Zollner, an industrialist, was born in Little Falls, Minnesota and received a degree from the University of Minnesota in 1927.  Zollner Corporation, formed in 1912, was a Tier-1 supplier of pistons to companies such as Ford, General Motors, International Harvester (now Navistar), John Deere and Outboard Marine. At one time, he employed more than 1,200 people in his Fort Wayne, Indiana foundry. The company had 230 employees when it was acquired by Kolbenschmidt Pierburg AG in 1999.

Zollner Island in Lake Kabetogama in Voyageurs National Park, where he had a cabin, is named for him.

Pro basketball
The Zollner Pistons began playing in 1939 as an independent and in 1941 joined the National Basketball League, which was just shaking off its roots as an industrial league.  In 1974, he recalled that, "Instead of making friends, we made enemies, because no one could beat us." He personally recruited his players, including later Hall of Famers Andy Phillip, Bob McDermott, Bob Houbregs, Buddy Jeannette and George Yardley. The Zollner Pistons were a very popular franchise, winning the world championship in 1944 and 1945, and reaching the NBA Finals in 1954 and 1955, losing both times.   He was the first pro basketball team owner to hire a bench coach.

Zollner brought together leaders of the NBL and the BAA to meet at his house in 1949. Sitting around his kitchen table, they agreed to merge, forming the NBA.

In 1952, when he purchased a DC-3, Zollner was the first to fly his players to away games. Zollner sent the plane to Milwaukee to meet the players and bring them to the game, but due to a mixup, coach John Kundla was left behind. He had gone to the dining car and didn't get word. As the train pulled out the station, he looked out the window and saw the other players waving to him.

The game started with Lakers player Jim Pollard acting as coach.  Kundla arrived shortly before halftime, and tried to sneak to the bench, but the fans spotted him and roared. "I took quite a razzing from the guys for that," said John, "especially since we were ahead by eight when I arrived and we ended up losing by five."

It soon became apparent that the NBA had outgrown small cities like Fort Wayne.  In 1957, Zollner moved the team to Detroit, a much larger city that had previously had an NBA franchise, the Detroit Falcons, which failed after the 1946–47 season, the NBA's (BAA's) first.  Since Detroit was the center of the automobile industry, the name Pistons still fit.  However, they were nowhere near as successful as they had been in Fort Wayne; they would only tally two winning seasons in the next 17 years.

By 1974, the Pistons' lackluster performance on the court was starting to hurt Zollner's bottom line; the team had never turned a profit since moving to Detroit.  Even the best regular season in franchise history at the time was not enough to stop the bleeding.  After the season, Zollner sold the Pistons to glass magnate William Davidson for $7 million (equal to $ million in ).  Zollner and Davidson remained the only two majority owners in the history of the NBA's second-oldest team until the death of Davidson in March, 2009.

At the 1975 Silver Anniversary NBA All-Star Game, Zollner was named "Mr. Pro Basketball" for his status as a founder and longtime supporter of the NBA. He died in North Miami, Florida.

On October 1, 1999, Zollner was inducted to the Naismith Memorial Basketball Hall of Fame as a contributor.

Remembrance
Concordia Lutheran High School in Fort Wayne, Indiana, uses the Fred Zollner Athletic Complex for their athletics.
The Zollner Foundation supports some charitable organizations in Indiana and in Florida.
Trine University uses the Fred Zollner Athletic Stadium, completed in 2010, a micro–stadium for football, lacrosse and soccer.
Indiana Tech in Fort Wayne, Indiana, named their engineering building the Zollner Engineering Center.

References

Further reading
 

1901 births
1982 deaths
People from Little Falls, Minnesota
University of Minnesota alumni
Naismith Memorial Basketball Hall of Fame inductees
Detroit Pistons owners
American industrialists
National Basketball League (United States) owners
Fort Wayne Zollner Pistons
20th-century American businesspeople